Arthur Wright may refer to:

 Arthur Wright (footballer) (1919–1985), English footballer who played for Sunderland
 Arthur Wright (police officer) (1861–1938), New Zealand policeman and police commissioner
 Arthur Wright (writer) (1870–1932), Australian novelist
 Arthur Wright (cricketer) (1886–1970), English cricketer and Royal Navy officer
 Arthur Wright (speedway rider) (1933–2016), English speedway rider
 Arthur E. Wright (1907–1977), Canadian politician
 Arthur F. Wright (1913–1976), American academic, sinologist, editor and professor of history
 Arthur G. Wright (1937–2015), American R&B guitarist and arranger
 Arthur Williams Wright (1836–1915), American physicist
 Arthur Cory-Wright (1869–1951), British businessman
 A. Gilbert Wright (1909–1987), American zoologist and museologist
 A. R. Wright (folklorist) (1862–1932), British folklorist

See also
 Wright (surname)